Alfred Athiel Thorne, LLD, MA, aka A.A. Thorne (August 14, 1871 – April 23, 1956), was a popular elected statesman, incisive author, pioneer for educational access, and human rights advocate in British Guyana. In 1894, Dr. Thorne founded and oversaw the world's first co-educational private secondary school of its kind, providing quality educational access to talented students regardless of their gender, ethnicity, color, or socio-economic status. Called the "Hero of The People", Thorne served as a popularly-elected official for more than 50 years, working to unify the collective voices of working-class white British colonists, Indo-Guyanese, Afro-Guyanese, Chinese, Portuguese, and Aboriginal Amerindian communities across British Guyana. He served numerous elected and appointed roles at both the national and municipal levels, including as Mayor of British Guiana's capital city, Georgetown. Thorne served many decades as an educator, columnist writer, and elected official in British Guiana, creating positive and lasting impact for generations by advocating for the core principles of educational access, workplace safety, human rights, democracy, and self-determination. 

Thorne founded and presided over the first human rights and labor rights institutions in the Western Hemisphere, advocating for pragmatic workplace safety and pay equity standards for workers by bringing together extremely diverse groups to align in support of their shared interests.  Thorne's first-of-its-kind worker alliances created unprecedented representation for the benefit of workers from both working-class and middle-class families across extremely diverse groups including first-generation descendants of formerly enslaved Africans, formerly indentured servants from India, China, and Portugal, as well as working-class white colonists from England, Scotland, Ireland and Wales. The resulting alliances became powerful enough to establish, elevate, and enforce new standards and principles for pay equity and workplace safety. Thorne's labor initiatives directly and tangibly improved the lives of working-class and middle-class families across Guyana, initiating new standards for improved working conditions for factory and field jobs across the entire British colonial empire -- earning A.A. Thorne the moniker "Hero of The People".

Born in the British West Indies island of Barbados, Thorne was highly educated as a British Classical Scholar, having earned both his Bachelor's degree and Master's degree from the prestigious Durham University, England's third oldest university. He was the first person of African descent across the entire British Empire to earn both a bachelor's degree and an advanced degree conferred by a British University. Notably, he earned both with academic honors.

Powerful advocate for Educational Access

After graduating with honors with two degrees from University of Durham in England, A.A. Thorne moved to British Guiana, where in 1894 he founded one of the world's first coeducational private secondary school that provided equal access to qualified students regardless of gender, color, ethnicity or socio-economic status.  It was called The Middle School because it was the first opportunity for students from middle-class and working-class families in the British colony to gain privileged access to the same level of quality education that had previously been reserved only for descendants of the former plantocracy (former slave-owning families) and aristocrats. Thorne's Middle School provided such high standards of education that his students' performance on the national tests exceeded the levels achieved by the most elite, prestigious and expensive private British schools whose admissions criteria made them exclusively accessible only to students from aristocratic and planter families, including the elite Queen's College (the prestigious boys-only school) and Bishops' High School (the prestigious girls-only school).

A.A. Thorne oversaw the development of this first-in-class coeducational secondary school as its Headmaster for many years, recruiting some of the best teachers from across the country. The exceptional performance of his school's graduating students marked his experiment in educational access as a monumental success.  Thorne established a needs-based financial aid system for all students, which he personally financed, breaking many barriers by enrolling both boys and girls from underprivileged working-class and moderate-income families with access to reduced tuition or tuition-free education that was comparable in quality to the educational level previously available only at the most expensive elite private educational institutions in the world -- creating broad educational access to talented girls and minorities long before gender rights and civil rights were protected by anti-discrimination laws and equal opportunity laws of the land. Thorne's private school became renowned for the high-quality education it provided on par with Queen's College and Bishops' High School.  As a result, Thorne's school also began attracting student applications from high-income families, causing the prestigious Queen's College to recognize the Middle School as credible competition for the most talented students in the country. Ultimately, recognizing the Middle School's exceptionalism, the trustees of Queen's College and Bishop's High School sought to merge Thorne's school together with their institutions, in exchange for the landmark commitment from Queens College and Bishop's High School to revise their admissions policies by assuring that all academically-qualified applicants from the groups previously excluded from their admissions would now have access to these elite schools, regardless of their ethnicity, color, or socio-economic background. The result: Many subsequent generations of students across Guyana from working-class families and minority backgrounds have attended, and excelled, as students at Queen's College -- many becoming Rhodes Scholars and Fulbright Scholars over the past 100 years.

50-year career as a Principled Statesman
A.A. Thorne served a prominent role in public service for decades, holding numerous elected offices at both the municipal and national level continuously for 50 years (from 1902 to 1952). Nationally, he was elected to the Combined Court in 1906 and re-elected to the Court again in 1916; elected as the Financial Representative for the North West District and New Amsterdam (1906-1911 and 1916-1921); elected and re-elected repeatedly as Georgetown City Council Member for 47 years starting in 1902; elected as Deputy Mayor in 1921, 1922 and 1925; and serving as Mayor of Georgetown.

While variously serving in the Legislative, Judicial, and Executive Branches of government, Thorne became widely recognized and celebrated for "throwing open certain avenues of employment to Guianese".
 Georgetown City Council, 1902-1949
 British Guiana National Court of Policy, 1906-1911, 1916-1921
 Georgetown Deputy Mayor, 1921, 1922, 1925
 The Education Commission, 1924-1925
 The Cost of Living Survey Committee, 1942
 The Franchise Commission, 1942-1944
 The Education Development Committee, 1943-1945
 British Guiana National Trade Council - Executive Officer, 1945
 The Georgetown Fire Advisory Committee, 1945
 The Georgetown Pure Water Supply Board, 1945-1946
 British Guiana Labour Union
 British Guiana Workers League, 1931-1952

Pioneer and Advocate for Human Rights and Workplace Safety

Thorne led the British Guiana Labour Union, the country's first worker's union. He also founded and led the country's second trade union, the British Guiana Workers' League, in 1931.[17] He served as the League's leader for 22 years. The League sought to protect basic human rights and improve the working conditions of Guyanese people of all ethnic backgrounds, many of whom had originally been brought to the British colony under a system of forced labor (slavery) or indentured servitude, or who were Amerindian natives of the land now occupied and taken over under the forces of European imperialism. He was also popular among the working class British community members for his advocacy on behalf of those who labored in factories long before the workplace safety standards and labor laws of today were enacted.

Thorne also served as President of the British Guiana Trades Union Council. The union represented the human rights interests of a wide variety of workers across vastly different trades, including manual laborers on sugar plantations, municipal workers in Georgetown, and ward-maids at the Georgetown Public Hospital. Thorne's work for workplace safety guidelines and labor rights laid the foundation for the formation of the Manpower Citizens' Association, which he also co-led.

Thorne was elected to the City Council of the British colony's capital city Georgetown in 1902. As a member of City Council, he was active in reform efforts of the colony. Two years after joining the council, in 1904, he published an article in a Boston, MA newspaper about the dominance of the sugar plantation owners and the sugar industry over all other economic sectors of the country. In their ill-fated attempt to retaliate while Thorne was traveling out of the country, the embarrassed planters arranged for an article of their own to be published in The Argosy, the local newspaper of Georgetown. The planters' article in Argosy served only to strengthen Thorne's vast popularity in his home country, as the masses admired Thorne's courage to speak the truth and stand up against corruption and intimidation by former slave holders. Each of the Argosy article's false claims was disproven in a court of law, as Thorne boldly won a landmark trial case against the planter-controlled Argosy which published the false article, and Thorne was awarded 500 British pounds by the court for his successful claim of libel. The now famous court case is documented as one of the most pivotal trials over the past 300 years that helped to shape modern rule of law in the Americas, and the entire landmark trial's transcript is published in Making of Modern Law: Trials, 1600-1926.

International Thought Leader and Trailblazer
Thorne first visited the United States in 1904 at the special invitation of the New York City Mayor. During this U.S. visit, Thorne traveled across the country, gaining instant popularity in many states and impressing American politicians and scholars as an exceptional orator and diplomat. Thorne received numerous speaking invitations, and delivered a keynote address to the President and Alumni of Wilberforce University, where the Senate conferred upon Thorne the degree of Doctor of Laws (LLD), a distinctive honor which they had only conferred previously on two other men: US President William McKinley, and Frederick Douglass. 

A.A. Thorne recognized that the 1919 Colonisation Scheme created friction and negative racial feelings in the colony of British Guiana. He was instrumental in advocating for fair wages for all citizens, and led the way for passage of increased wages for East Indians and Chinese workers (whose parents had been brought to the country under indenture), and for African workers (whose parents had been kidnapped from the African continent and trafficked to the country as slaves). 

A.A. Thorne helped to make the country's agricultural industry more internationally competitive by demonstrating how colonial control over rice production, a staple sustenance crop in the colony at the time, had led to unwise and uncompetitive pricing practices, resulting in rice being priced higher in British Guiana than neighboring countries and islands. One of Thorne's sons, the Ivy League-educated economics professor Alfred P. Thorne, PhD, later built on these insights in reference to the problematic issues that emerged from artificially maintaining a supply of low-cost labor in developing countries, in his book Poor By Design.

A.A. Thorne is widely referenced as a pivotal historical figure in connection with the development and spread of core principles behind the concepts of self-determination, democracy, educational access, workplace safety, human rights, gender equality, civil rights, and rule of law, each of which he promoted rigorously. These concepts led to many transformational social changes that spread across the world during the 19th century. His perspectives were included in Nancy Cunard's Negro: An Anthology in a chapter titled 'The Negro and his Descendants in British Guiana' In it, he describes the social and economic conditions of black and brown people living in the plantation-based colonies of Guiana under Dutch, French and British rule.

Early life, education, and family
A.A. Thorne was born in the former British island colony of Barbados, to Louisa Jane Alleyne and Samuel Athiel Thorne, a highly educated Black schoolmaster in Barbados. A.A. Thorne completed his early education at the Lodge School, then graduated from Codrington College in St John, Barbados, and subsequently earned both his Bachelor's and Advanced degrees in England at the University of Durham, graduating with honors.

The British Empire's highest-scoring secondary school graduating student on the national exam each year was awarded a national scholarship to attend Durham University in England. However, no Black student had ever before won this prestigious national scholarship. Thorne achieved the highest score in the national exam. Shocked by having a Black student outperform every White student in the country, the country's Scholarship Committee denied Thorne's academic scholarship award, despite acknowledging that Thorne achieved the undisputed highest-score among all students on the national exam. Instead, the Scholarship Committee offered the scholarship to the white student who had achieved the second-highest score on the national exam. Revealing the courage and charisma that would define Thorne's storied future career, the young Thorne sued the national Scholarship Committee in the British colonial courts -- and Thorne won his first landmark court case. Persuaded by Thorne's convincing arguments which were based on the country's own standards and laws, the British court ordered the Scholarship Committee to comply with the British rules for the university scholarship, and required the rules to be followed as written.  As a result, Thorne's first (but not last) history-making court case  granted him, as the top score on the national exams, to the academic scholarship to attend Durham University in England, where he graduated with not one, but two degrees -- with Honors. He became the first person of African heritage in the British Empire to earn both a bachelor's and advanced degree from any university in England. 

After graduating from Durham University, Thorne moved to British Guiana. He married schoolteacher and artist Eleanor Amanda McLean, then became a young widower upon her untimely death. Years later, he married the beautiful and talented teacher named Violet Janet Ashurst, the British Classical Scholar and artist. Ashurst was born and raised in British Guyana, the daughter of Charles Ashurst and Elizabeth Jane Alexander. Her family was from Belfast, Ireland and Africa. A.A. Thorne remained happily married to Violet Thorne for the rest of his long life. 
A.A. Thorne had ten children, including two sets of twins:
1. Alfred Hubert Thorne (Editor-in-Chief of Argosy and Chronicle, two influential national newspapers in Guyana), 
2.& 3. Twin brothers (Albert Athiel Thorne and Alfred Thorne, an attorney who earned his law degree in the UK and worked as a justice of the peace in Guyana), 
4.& 5. Twin sisters Alfreda and Elfreda,
6. Alfred Palmer Thorne, PhD, MBA (Fulbright Scholar, economics professor, and author who earned his PhD at Columbia University in New York City)
7. Duncan John Vivian Thorne, DDS (one of the first Black orthodontists in New York City, having earned his doctorate at University of Pennsylvania), 
8. Arthur George Thorne (who was his mother Violet's primary care-giver into her 100th year), 
9. Aileen Roselle Callender (who became the first Black female manager of the Port Authority of New York and New Jersey),
10. C. Michael Thorne, MD (award-winning physician and chief of staff at a leading hospital in Ohio, and a medical school professor at The Ohio State University School of Medicine)

Publications

 'On Industrial Training in British Guiana', Timehri, 1911 & 1912
 'Education in British Guiana, Part I', Timehri, 1911
 'Education in British Guiana, Part II', Timehri, Vol. 11, (third series), (1912).
 'British Guianese Progress and Limitations', Timehri, Vo1. II, (third series), (1912).
 'The Negro and his Descendants in British Guiana', Negro: An Anthology, N. Cunard (Ed.), 1934
 'A.A. Thorne v. The Argosy Co., Ltd. and W. Macdonald' (BiblioLife Network, Harvard Law School Library), 1905

References

See also 
Thorne, Alfred Athiel in Oxford African American Studies Center

Thorne, Alfred P. 

British emigrants to Guyana
Immigrants to British Guiana
Guyanese politicians
1871 births
1956 deaths
Guyanese people of World War II
Alumni of Codrington College